Nanzatico is a historic plantation house located at King George Court House, King George County, Virginia. It was built about 1770, and is a frame, two-story structure, seven-bays wide, with a hipped roof, and two interior end chimneys. The front facade features an engaged portico consisting of heroic pilasters, entablature, and bulls-eye pediment.  Also on the property are the contributing square frame smokehouse, a frame summer kitchen, and a frame schoolhouse or office. Next to Mount Vernon, Nanzatico is probably the most formal frame colonial mansion in Virginia.

It was listed on the National Register of Historic Places in 1969.

References

Plantation houses in Virginia
Houses on the National Register of Historic Places in Virginia
Colonial architecture in Virginia
Houses completed in 1770
Houses in King George County, Virginia
National Register of Historic Places in King George County, Virginia
1770 establishments in Virginia